Lavelle is a census-designated place located in Butler Township, Schuylkill County in the state of Pennsylvania, United States.  Lavelle was part of the Lavelle-Locustdale CDP for the 2000 census, before splitting into the two separate CDPs of Lavelle and Locustdale.  The community is located along Pennsylvania Route 901.  As of the 2010 census the population was 742 residents.

Demographics

References

Census-designated places in Schuylkill County, Pennsylvania
Census-designated places in Pennsylvania